The Iranian Cyber Army is an Iranian computer hacker group. It is thought to be connected to Iranian government, although it is not officially recognized as an entity by the government. It has pledged loyalty to Supreme Leader of Iran.

According to Tehran Bureau, the Islamic Revolutionary Guard initiated plans for the formation of an Iranian Cyber Army in 2005. The organisation is believed to have been commanded by Mohammad Hussein Tajik until his assassination.

The group has claimed responsibility for several attacks conducted over the Internet since 2009, most notably attacks against Baidu and Twitter. The attack against Baidu resulted in the so-called Sino-Iranian Hacker War. In 2012, a group self-identified as "Parastoo" ( - Swallow) hacked the International Atomic Energy Agency's servers: the Iranian Cyber Army is suspected of being behind the attack.

In 2013, a general in the Islamic Revolutionary Guards stated that Iran had "the 4th biggest cyber power among the world's cyber armies", a claim supported by the Israeli Institute for National Security Studies.

See also 
 Cyberwarfare in Iran

References 

Hacker groups
Cyberwarfare in Iran
Hacking in the 2010s